Nishtar Hospital is a teaching hospital of Nishtar Medical University, located in Multan, Pakistan. It is a tertiary care hospital, owned by  the Government of Punjab. It serves a large population of South Punjab.

Accredited hospital
Nishtar Hospital is accredited by the College of Physicians and Surgeons of Pakistan.

History
It is named after Sardar Abdur Rab Nishtar, former Governor of Punjab, Pakistan, a Pakistan Movement activist, a celebrated companion of the Father of Nation, Muhammad Ali Jinnah.

The construction of the Nishtar Hospital block started in 1953. The basic idea and its plan were provided by Dr. M. J. Bhutta. It started functioning with 80 beds on October 1, 1953.

Facilities 
The hospital's total bed capacity currently stands at 1,850 beds. It has 24 departments and divisions, over 31 wards, a burn unit, an outpatient, and an Accident & Emergency Department, in addition to 15 operation theaters.

Administration  
Shahid Bukhari has been the Medical Superintendent of the hospital since 2019.

2022 incident
In October 2022, it was discovered that multiple abandoned dead bodies which remained unclaimed, were stored on the roof of the hospital instead of proper burial. Later, HOD Anatomy Department revealed that the bodies could not be buried because of policy of handover of corpses to Police, which didn't take place owing to delay.
horrific videos and images of multiple deceased people found on the roptop of the Hospital, Multan in a bad condition circulated on social media. After the pictures and videos came out, questions arose on social media that whose bodies are these and why they are lying helpless.

Police and rescue personnel were blamed by a representative of the Hospital for the decomposing remains.

Investigation
Following incident, the Punjab government last night announced an investigation and required the Nishtar Hospital medical superintendent to provide an explanation within three days. A six-person committee was established by the Punjab government to look into the shocking incident. The South Punjab Health Department would get the results of the investigation.

The preliminary investigation report was given to Chief Minister Chaudhry Pervaiz Elahi on October 13, 2022, who then ordered the dismissal of Dr. Mariam Ashraf, the head of the anatomy department at Nishtar Medical University (NMU), along with the suspension of three doctors, three hospital staff members, and two SHOs of the corresponding police stations.

References

Hospital buildings completed in 1953
Teaching hospitals in Pakistan
Hospitals in Multan
Buildings and structures in Multan
Hospitals established in 1953
Nasreddin Murat-Khan buildings and structures